"I Just Started Hating Some People Today" is a single by the American alternative rock singer Beck, released on May 28, 2012.

Background
"I Just Started Hating Some People Today" was first recorded in 2012 as part of the Blue Serie of Jack White's label Third Man Records in the studio of the label.

Track listing
Digital download
All songs written and composed by Beck Hansen.
 "I Just Started Hating Some People Today" – 5:08
 "Blue Randy" – 3:52

Charts

Personnel

Musicians
Beck Hansen – vocals, electric guitar, harmonica (track 1)
Jack White – drums, electric guitar (track 1), punk vocals (track 1), background vocals (track 1)
Dean Fertita – keyboards (track 1), acoustic guitar (track 1), bass, background vocals (track 1)
Fats Kaplin – fiddle (track 1), pedal steel
Karen Elson – jazz vocals (track 1)
Randy Blau – laser tag (track 2)

Technical
Jack White III – production
Joshua Smith – recording
Mindy Watts – recording assistant, producer assistant

Artwork
Jo McCaughey – photography
Matthew Jacobson – design

References

2012 singles
Beck songs
Songs written by Beck
2012 songs
Third Man Records singles